Kranski Lake is a lake in the U.S. state of Wisconsin.

The lake is named after August Kranski, an early settler. Variant names are "Kranchi Lake", "Krancks Lake", and "Kraneks Lake". Kranski Lake is a 6 acre lake located in Portage County. It has a maximum depth of 33 feet. Fish include Panfish and Largemouth Bass.

References

Lakes of Wisconsin
Bodies of water of Portage County, Wisconsin